Mäxmüd Khan (pronounced );  in Russian chronicles Махмутек (Makhmutek); ?-1466) was the Khan of the Khanate of Kazan from 1445-1466. He was the eldest son of Oluğ Möxämmäd, and is reputed to be one of the Khanate's founders. Mäxmüd participated in his father's military campaigns against Muscovy and in 1445 was victorious at the Battle of Suzdal, taking the Grand Duke of Moscow Vasily II captive and forcing Muscovy to pay tribute (yasak). After the death of Oluğ Möxämmäd, Mäxmüd succeeded to the throne of Kazan. In December 1446 he supported Vassily II in dethroning Dmitry Shemyaka. In 1448 Mäxmüd attacked Moscow to preserve advantageous treaty conditions that were concluded after the battle of Suzdal. In that period, the Qasim Khanate, governed by Mäxmüd's relatives, was created as a buffer state between Muscovy and the Khanate of Kazan.

1467 deaths
Khanate of Kazan
15th-century monarchs in Europe
Year of birth unknown